Petek is a village in the Murgul District, Artvin Province, Turkey. Its population is 131 (2021).
Its economy is based on agriculture and animal husbandry.

References

Villages in Murgul District